Steve, Stephen or Steven Walsh may refer to:

 Steve Walsh (American football) (born 1966), former quarterback in the National Football League
 Steve Walsh (DJ) (1959–1988), British disc jockey
 Steve Walsh (footballer) (born 1964), former professional footballer
 Steve Walsh (musician) (born 1951), of the 1970s progressive rock band Kansas
 Steve Walsh (rugby league) (born 1958), Australian rugby league player for South Sydney
 Steve Walsh (referee) (born 1972), New Zealand referee affiliated to the Australian Rugby Union
 Steven Walsh (born 1973), American politician
 Stephen Walsh (athlete) (born 1960), retired male long jumper from New Zealand
 Stephen Walsh (hurler) (born 1985), Irish hurler
 Stephen Walsh (money manager) (born 1944), American money manager
 Stephen Walsh (politician) (1859–1929), British miner, trade unionist and Labour Party politician
 Stephen Walsh (writer), English writer and scholar
 Steve Walsh (scout), English football scout